The Cohuna Line is a closed railway line in the north of Victoria, Australia. Branching off the Bendigo-Deniliquin line at Elmore, it ran north-west to a final terminus at Cohuna.

History
The line was progressively opened between 1912 and 1915.

Stations
Cohuna Railway Station 185 Miles
1915 – 1 March 1981.
Keely Railway Station 181 Miles
1915 – 1 March 1981.
Leitchville Railway Station 177 Miles
1915 – 1 March 1981.
Gunbower Railway Station 172 Miles
1915 – 1 March 1981.
Patho Railway Station 165 Miles
1915 – 1 March 1981.
Roslynmead 157 Miles
1915 – 1 March 1981.
Kotta 152 Miles
1915 – 1 March 1981.
Lockington 147 Miles
1915 – 1 March 1981.
McColl 144 Miles
1915 – 1 March 1981.
Hunter 135 Miles
1915 – 1 March 1981.
Elmore 128 Miles
21 November 1873 – 9 November 2008.

References

External links

Closed regional railway lines in Victoria (Australia)